Hippoporidridae is a family of bryozoans belonging to the order Cheilostomatida.

Genera:
 Abditoporella Sosa-Yañez, Vieira & Solís-Marín, 2015
 Fodinella Tilbrook, Hayward & Gordon, 2001
 Hippoporella Canu, 1917
 Hippoporidra Canu & Bassler, 1927
 Hippotrema Canu & Bassler, 1927
 Odontoporella Héjjas, 1894
 Scorpiodinipora Balavoine, 1959

References

Cheilostomatida